Pietro Antonio de Angelis (died 1553) was a Roman Catholic prelate who served as Bishop of Nepi e Sutri (1542–1553).

Biography
On 7 August 1542, Pietro Antonio de Angelis was appointed during the papacy of Pope Paul III as Bishop of Nepi e Sutri.
He served as Bishop of Nepi e Sutri' until his death in 1553.

References

External links and additional sources
 (for Chronology of Bishops) 
 (for Chronology of Bishops) 

16th-century Italian Roman Catholic bishops
Bishops appointed by Pope Paul III
1553 deaths